Joshua Swanson (born 1978) is an American actor and narrator of audiobooks.

Career overview

American theater

Swanson went to Westmont College for training in the theater arts under John H. Cochran, a former department chair and professor at the Yale School of Drama, and John Blondell, full professor and founder of Lit Moon Theatre Company of Santa Barbara.

Film and television
Swanson moved to Los Angeles and had minor roles in television shows as The New Dragnet, City Guys, General Hospital, Strong Medicine, and Providence.  His film roles have included  ''National Lampoon's Van Wilder and "Baggage".

Swanson began studying at the improvisation theater The Second City, and began doing voice-over work for various companies. He did network promotion work for Fox Television Studios, Cartoon Network, WE: Women's Entertainment and Starz!. His voice work includes Stan in the 2007 video game Obscure II, Maurice in Pokémon: The Rise of Darkrai, and the narrator in the popular Animal Planet television series SuperFetch (TV series).

References

External links 
Joshua Swanson Official Website

1978 births
Living people
American male film actors
American male voice actors
People from Chicago
American male television actors
Westmont College alumni
Audiobook narrators